Willie Dick is an Australian rules footballer who played for Perth in the West Australian Football League and Essendon in the Australian Football League.

Originally from Goomalling in the Wheatbelt region, Dick played in 156 games for Perth between 1985 and 2000.  In 2012 he was named as one of the Top 25 WAFL players from the past 25 years.

He was drafted by Essendon in the second round of the 1991 AFL Draft. He made his début against St Kilda in round 1 of 1992 season. He played seven games for the senior team and was a member of Essendons reserves premiership team. He left the club at the end of the season for family reasons.

His nephew Brad Dick played for Collingwood between 2007 and 2011 and is currently on the  rookie list.

References

External links

1966 births
Living people
Essendon Football Club players
Perth Football Club players
Indigenous Australian players of Australian rules football
Australian rules footballers from Western Australia
Indigenous Australians from Western Australia
People from Goomalling, Western Australia